William Morris Finlay (9 August 1926 – 4 September 2014) was a Scottish professional football player and coach.

Career
Born in Auchterderran, Finlay played as a centre half for Bowhill Rovers, East Fife, Clyde and Raith Rovers, making a total of 476 appearances in the Scottish Football League.

With East Fife he won the League Cup three times (1947–48, 1949–50, 1952–53) plus the 1947–48 Scottish Division Two title, two B Division Supplementary Cups and a Scottish Cup runners-up medal in 1949–50; with Clyde he won the Scottish Cup in 1957–58 plus two lower-tier titles (1956–57 and 1961–62). He was among the most highly regarded players of the period never selected to represent Scotland, though at the time there was a strong pool of local talent at various clubs across the country.

After retiring from playing he became manager of Lochore Welfare. He died in 2014, at which time he had been the longest-living member of East Fife's 'golden era' between the 1930s and 1950s.

References

1926 births
2014 deaths
Scottish footballers
Scottish football managers
East Fife F.C. players
Clyde F.C. players
Raith Rovers F.C. players
Scottish Football League players
Association football defenders
Scottish Junior Football Association players
Scottish Junior Football Association managers
People from Cardenden
Footballers from Fife
Bowhill Rovers F.C. players